Patriot Act is Australian thriller author James Phelan second book, and the second book in the Lachlan Fox series.

Plot summary

Lachlan Fox, former Royal Australian Navy Special Forces Clearance Diver, now investigative journalist for GSR (Global Syndicate Reporters) grows suspicious when several high-profile businessmen and politicians are murdered in Europe. A coup is being planned by the United States' biggest European rival, France. Echelon is under attack as the United States rushes to avoid an armed conflict between France and the United States. Meanwhile, Fox's life is threatened by French DGSE agents who wish to assassinate Fox and girlfriend Kate.

See also
 UKUSA Agreement
 Fox Hunt (novel)

References

External links
UKUSA Agreement at The National Archives
UKUSA Agreement at the National Security Agency

2007 Australian novels
Novels by James Clancy Phelan
Techno-thriller novels
Hachette (publisher) books